Childe can be a surname. Notable people with the surname include:

 Elias Childe, English painter
 Henry Langdon Childe, English entertainer
 James Warren Childe, English painter
 Vere Gordon Childe, Australian philologist and archaeologist
 Wilfred Rowland Childe, British poet and critic

As a given name it may refer to:

 Childe Hassam
 Childe or Tartaglia, a fictional character from Genshin Impact

See also
 Childe
 Child (surname)
 Childe the Hunter